Staroye Annino is a rural locality (a village) in Petushinskoye Rural Settlement, Petushinsky District, Vladimir Oblast, Russia. The population was 92 as of 2010. There are 17 streets.

Geography 
Staroye Annino is located 12 km west of Petushki (the district's administrative centre) by road. Novoye Annino is the nearest rural locality.

References 

Rural localities in Petushinsky District